Alice Attie (born in 1950) is an American visual artist and published poet from New York City.

Education
After graduating from Barnard College in New York City with a degree in French literature, Attie obtained an MFA in poetry, studying under June Jordan at the City College of New York. Attie went on to complete a PhD from the Graduate School of the City University of New York in comparative literature, with a doctoral dissertation focused on "modern elegy, specifically on the meeting place of language and the unspeakable: how we accommodate what is inaccessible to language".

Photography and visual art 
Attie's drawing practice began as an exploration of literary texts, as the expanded inscriptions which they inspired.  Class Notes, ongoing, is a series of drawings composed during graduate philosophy and physics seminars at Columbia University. Attie's class notes are taken in the form of drawings.

Attie's drawing series Take Care of Yourself, inspired by the lectures of Michel Foucault at the College de France, are writing-drawing abstractions formed by repetitions of the phrase "Take Care of Yourself", referencing the Socratic notion of care as it was addressed in Foucault's studies.

Attie's recent photographs feature the meadows, parks, and fields of Iceland, New Hampshire, upstate New York, and Central Park. Taken with her father's old 1937 Rolleiflex camera, her photographs explore the idea of nature as visual poetry.

Her photographic work and drawings on paper can be found in collections at The Whitney Museum of American Art, The Museum of Modern Art, The Studio Museum in Harlem, The Jewish Museum, The Getty Museum in Los Angeles and The Museum of Fine Arts in Houston, Texas, among others.

In 2001, Attie published Alice Attie: Harlem on the Verge, (with introduction by historian Robin D. G. Kelley), a photography book of photo portraits and storefronts documenting modern-day Harlem on the verge of gentrification. In 2012, Attie collaborated with photographs in books by Gayatri Chakravorty Spivak: Harlem and An Aesthetic Education in the Age of Globalization. In 2012, Attie collaborated with philosopher Giorgio Agamben contributing photographs to his book, The Church and the Kingdom.

Photographs of the artist June Leaf, taken over eighteen years, accompany images of June's drawings in the book Attie completed with Steidl Press to accompany the 2016 Whitney Museum Exhibition: June Leaf: Thought is Infinite.

Poetry 
Attie's first volume of poetry, These Figures Lining the Hills, was published by Seagull Books in November 2015. These Figures Lining the Hills was inspired by a request from Naveen Kishore of Seagull Books: a call to "write about notes, notes that we write to ourselves, in journals, in notebooks, perhaps notes that we imagine writing, fragments of notes, notes in margins, and notes, perhaps, that are not written". Having kept a journal for almost 50 years, Attie culled from her recent notebooks. Attie's poetry book Under the Aleppo Sun, 2018, with Seagull Books/University of Chicago Press, is a collection of poems were inspired by her visit to Aleppo, Syria, the home of her grandparents, in March 2011, as the war in Syria was taking hold.

Influences 
Attie studied under June Jordan while obtaining her MFA in poetry. She cites George Oppen, William Carlos Williams, and recently, Alice Oswald, as some of many poets who inspire her. She cites the works of the work of Franz Kafka as formative to her work in literature and art. Like Kafka, she sees her work as a mediation between two worlds, one which could be articulated and another which hovered, above or outside, but never in the field of definition. Among her cherished books are: To the Lighthouse by Virginia Woolf and As I Lay Dying by William Faulkner and she keeps the Collected Poems of Wallace Stevens on her nightstand or in her suitcase.

Exhibitions 
 2020 C19, Stones, Portraits of Ambiguity, Intensities, Abstractions,  Galerie nächst St. Stephan Rosemarie Schwarzwälder
 2018 Possibilities, Where are you?  Galerie nächst St. Stephan Rosemarie Schwarzwälder
 2017 Where am I?  Galerie nächst St. Stephan Rosemarie Schwarzwälder
 2016 Series Refugees, Silence  Galerie nächst St. Stephan Rosemarie Schwarzwälder
 2014 Green Weather  Galerie nächst St. Stephan Rosemarie Schwarzwälder
 2012 Physics  Galerie nächst St. Stephan Rosemarie Schwarzwälder

References

Sources
 Howard Greenberg Gallery
 Flaherty, Meghan. "Review: Harlem by Gayatri Chakravorty Spivak & Alice Attie" Columbia Journal (2013)

External links 
 

1950 births
Living people
20th-century American women artists
21st-century American women artists
Artists from New York City
Barnard College alumni
City College of New York alumni
City University of New York alumni